Clair Lake may refer to:

Place names 

 Clair Lake (Sainte-Christine-d'Auvergne), a lake on the slope of the Noire River, Portneuf Regional County Municipality, Capitale-Nationale, Quebec, Canada
 Claire River (Thompson River tributary), a river of Quebec
 Clair Lake (inventor)

See also
 Lake Clare, a lake in the U.S. state of Missouri
 Lake Claire (disambiguation)
 Lake Saint Clair (disambiguation)